Kalimpong cheese is made in and named after Kalimpong, a hill station in the Indian state of West Bengal. When unripe, Kalimpong cheese is a little like a rustic Welsh Caerphilly: white, slightly acidic and a little crumbly in the centre with a relatively smooth (edible) rind that is yellowy on the inside, with a bit of a tang and not particularly strong-smelling.

Kalimpong cheese making was started by Father Andre Butty, a parish priest in Kalimpong. It is still made in 12 kg and 1 kg wheels and is produced in limited quantities, like Gouda. While production of the nearby region Sikkim's Gouda has been taken over by Amul, a small amount of the local variety by Pappu Dairy Co-op, which shut down wholescale production a few years ago, is available occasionally. Kalimpong cheese and some variety of mozzarella is produced by Dairy Makarios Bous, Kalimpong (only  are made each day) in Kolkata's New Market.

When kept well-wrapped in a refrigerator for a few months to ripen, the flavour of Kalimpong cheese matures slightly, like a good Gouda, and there will be a slight change in colouration and increased moulding on the rind, which is normal. It can be eaten by itself, or with grapes and crackers, or melted in a cheese, ham and mustard toast. It is considered to be good for crumbling into salads and great to eat on its own with a little Guava cheese or Aam papad.

See also

References

External links
  FAO document The technology of traditional milk products in developing countries

Indian cheeses
Cow's-milk cheeses
Bengali cuisine
Kalimpong